Svätuše is a village and municipality in the Trebišov District in the Košice Region of south-eastern Slovakia.

History
In historical records the village was first mentioned in 1245.

Geography
It has a population of about 900 people.

Ethnicity
The village is about 95% Hungarian, 4% Slovak and 1% Ukrainian and Czech.

Facilities
The village has a public library and a soccer pitch.

External links
 
http://www.statistics.sk/mosmis/eng/run.html

Villages and municipalities in Trebišov District
Hungarian communities in Slovakia
Zemplín (region)